MarineDepot.com is an e-commerce company that sells aquarium supplies for reef-keeping hobbyist and fish-keeping. It is based in Garden Grove, California. The company was founded in 1997 by Ken Wong. MarineDepot.com is a subsidiary of Fins, Furs & Feathers, Inc.

History 
In 1997, pre-med student and self-professed "reef geek" Ken Wong was frustrated: there wasn't a single fish store in Orange County, California that could satisfy all his saltwater aquarium needs under one roof. Sometimes a store wouldn't have the right product. Other times store employees were unable to answer technical questions about the products they carried. Wong often found himself commuting from store-to-store in order to find the best products, the best prices and the best advice. This gave him an idea.

Wong envisioned a one-stop shop where customers could find everything they needed, from product specifications and information on marine aquarium fish species to expert advice on the hobby and friendly, one-on-one technical support. He began contacting product manufacturers and distributors to secure inventory and, armed with some off-the-shelf software and a copy of HTML 4 For Dummies, Wong launched the first MarineDepot.com website on January 7, 1998.

It began as a one-man operation in a one-bedroom apartment. He fielded customer service calls, packed orders, handled the books and was the company IT guy. Wong invested everything he had into his startup company. His dedication paid off: with the advent of always-on Internet technologies like DSL, along with advancements in the aquarium hobby, Wong's small business grew exponentially.

Wong relocated MarineDepot.com in 1999 from his apartment to a 1,000 square foot location in a Santa Ana, California strip mall. Continued growth necessitated another move midway through 2000 to a larger 3,600 square foot location in Costa Mesa, California. Later that same year, the company moved into an even larger 5,500 square foot warehouse. In early 2001, MarineDepot.com moved into a 15,000 square foot building on Gene Autry Way in Anaheim, California, down the street from Angel Stadium. The company acquired a second 9,500 square foot building to accommodate additional staff and inventory. In 2007, the company moved into its current 30,000 square foot location in Garden Grove, California. In 2015, MarineDepot.com expanded its logistics operations and added a distribution center in Atlanta George. With two warehouses, Marine Depot is able to deliver about 90% of its orders within 2 shipping days.

Education 
MarineDepot.com began providing educational materials to its customers since it started in 1998. You can find their calculators  on their site, educational articles, and videos on YouTube. Because keeping a saltwater aquarium is generally considered difficult, MarineDepot.com sees the main way to success in keep an aquarium is proper education.

Catalog 
MarineDepot.com began printing a biannual product catalog in 2002, which was a staple of the brand. Catalogs were mailed twice yearly to customers, usually in the fall and spring. A typical catalog contains 136 or more pages and consists of non-paid product placements accompanied by paid advertisements. The catalog was discontinued in 2016.

Products 
MarineDepot.com specializes in the sale of marine aquarium and reef aquarium supplies. They also carry an assortment of freshwater aquarium products and equipment for ponds, water features and water gardens. In total, the company carries more than 7,500 products, which include the following:

 Lighting (Metal halide, fluorescent and LED)
 Filters
 Heaters
 Protein skimmer
 Refugiums
 Sumps
 Calcium reactors
 Live sand
 Substrate
 Air Stones
 Medications
 Aquariums
 Additives & Supplements
 Test Kits
 Refractometers
 Thermometers
 Books
 Aquascaping tools
 UV Sterilizers
 Ozonizers
 Reverse osmosis systems
 Tropical fish food
 Plumbing parts

Honors and awards

References 

Aquariums